The 2003 season was the Hawthorn Football Club's 79th season in the Australian Football League and their 102nd season overall.

Fixture

Premiership season

Ladder

References

Hawthorn Football Club seasons